Goodyera, commonly called rattlesnake plantain, jade orchids or ladies' tresses is a wide-ranging genus of orchids in the tribe Cranichideae. About 100 species of Goodyera have been formally described. With a center of diversity in East Asia, Goodyera is found across Europe, Madeira, North and Central America, Australia, and on islands from the west Indian Ocean to the Pacific Ocean. They have a rosette of leaves at their base and usually many small white resupinate flowers. They are similar to orchids in the genus Spiranthes but can be distinguished from them by the shape and colour patterns of the leaves.

Description
Plants in the genus Goodyera are mainly terrestrial plants with a fleshy, creeping rhizome and a loose rosette of leaves at the base of a flowering stem with many small, resupinate flowers. The leaves are elliptic, characteristically asymmetrical and green with white or pale green markings. The entire plant apart from the flowers is covered with slightly sticky hairs. The dorsal sepal and petals overlap, forming a hood over the column and the lateral sepals spread widely. The labellum is not lobed but has a small pouch. Orchids in the genus Spiranthes are similar but Spiranthes lack rhizomes, have flat, non-pouched labella, and display plain green leaves.

Taxonomy and naming
The genus Goodyera was first formally described in 1813 by Robert Brown and the description was published in William Aiton's Hortus Kewensis. The genus name honours John Goodyer.

Generic delimitation of Goodyera remains problematic, with some authors providing evidence to support a narrower circumscription of the genus.

The genus is abbreviated G. in horticultural nomenclature.

Distribution
With a center of diversity in East Asia, Goodyera is found across Europe, Madeira, North and Central America, Australia, and on islands from the west Indian Ocean to the Pacific Ocean.

List of species
The following is a list of species of Goodyera recognised by the World Checklist of Selected Plant Families as at August 2018:

Goodyera afzelii Schltr. (1918)
Goodyera alveolata  Pradhan (1979)
Goodyera amoena  Schltr. (1911)
Goodyera angustifolia  Schltr. (1905) 
Goodyera beccarii  Schltr. (1910)
Goodyera bifida (Blume) Blume (1858)
Goodyera biflora (Lindl.) Hook.f. (1890)
Goodyera bomiensis  K.Y.Lang (1978)
Goodyera boninensis  Nakai (1923)
Goodyera brachystegia  Hand.-Mazz. (1936)
Goodyera bracteata  Thouars (1822)
Goodyera bradeorum  Schltr. (1923)
Goodyera clausa (A.A.Eaton ex Ames) Schltr. (1911)
Goodyera colorata (Blume) Blume (1858)
Goodyera condensata  Ormerod & J.J.Wood (2001)
Goodyera corniculata (Rchb.f.) Ackerman
Goodyera crocodiliceps  Ormerod (1996)
Goodyera cyclopensis Ormerod (2017)
Goodyera daibuzanensis  Yamam. (1932)
Goodyera denticulata  J.J.Sm. (1934)
Goodyera dolabripetala (Ames) Schltr. (1908
Goodyera elmeri (Ames) Ames (1938)
Goodyera erosa (Ames & C.Schweinf.) Ames, F.T.Hubb. & C.Schweinf. (1934)
Goodyera erythrodoides  Schltr. (1911)
Goodyera fimbrilabia  Ormerod (2006)
Goodyera flaccida  Schltr. (1924)
Goodyera foliosa (Lindl.) Benth. ex Hook.f. (1890)
Goodyera fumata  Thwaites (1861)
Goodyera fusca (Lindl.) Hook.f. (1890
Goodyera gemmata  J.J.Sm. (1909)
Goodyera gibbsiae  J.J.Sm. (1922)
Goodyera goudotii  Ormerod & Cavestro (2006)
Goodyera hachijoensis  Yatabe (1891)
Goodyera hemsleyana  King & Pantl. (1895)
Goodyera henryi  Rolfe (1896)
Goodyera hispaniolae  Dod (1986)
Goodyera hispida  Lindl. (1857)
Goodyera humicola (Schltr.) Schltr. (1924)
Goodyera inmeghema  Ormerod (1996)
Goodyera kwangtungensis  C.L.Tso (1933)
Goodyera lamprotaenia  Schltr. (1911)
Goodyera lanceolata  Ridl. (1870)
Goodyera luzonensis  Ames (1915)
Goodyera macrophylla  Lowe (1831)
Goodyera major  Ames & Correll (1942)
Goodyera makuensis Ormerod (2013)
Goodyera malipoensis Q.X.Guan & S.P.Chen (2014)
Goodyera maurevertii  Blume (1858)
Goodyera micrantha  Schltr. (1923)
Goodyera modesta  Schltr. (1923)
Goodyera myanmarica  Ormerod & C.S.Kumar (2006)
Goodyera nankoensis  Fukuy. (1934)
Goodyera nantoensis Hayata (1911)
Goodyera novembrilis (Rchb.f.) Ormerod (1996)
Goodyera oblongifolia  Raf. (1833)
Goodyera ovatilabia  Schltr. (1923)
Goodyera pendula  Maxim. (1888) 
Goodyera perrieri (Schltr.) Schltr. (1924) 
Goodyera polyphylla  Ormerod (2006) 
Goodyera porphyrophylla  Schltr. (1921)
Goodyera procera (Ker Gawl.) Hook. (1823)
Goodyera pubescens (Willd.) R.Br. (1813)
Goodyera purpusii  Ormerod (2006)
Goodyera pusilla  Blume (1858) 
Goodyera ramosii  Ames  (1913 publ. 1914)
Goodyera recurva  Lindl. (1857)
Goodyera repens (L.) R.Br. (1813)
Goodyera reticulata (Blume) Blume (1858)
Goodyera rhombodoides Aver (2007)
Goodyera robusta  Hook.f. (1890)
Goodyera rosea (H.Perrier) Ormerod (2006)
Goodyera rostellata  Ames & C.Schweinf. in O.Ames (1920)
Goodyera rostrata  Ridl. (1908)
Goodyera rosulacea  Y.N.Lee (2004)
Goodyera rubicunda (Blume) Lindl. (1839)
Goodyera ruttenii  J.J.Sm. (1928)
Goodyera schlechtendaliana  Rchb.f. (1850)
Goodyera scripta (Rchb.f.) Schltr. (1906)
Goodyera sechellarum (S.Moore) Ormerod (2002)
Goodyera seikomontana  Yamam. (1932)
Goodyera similis Blume (1858)
Goodyera stelidifera  Ormerod (2004)
Goodyera stenopetala  Schltr. (1911)
Goodyera striata  Rchb.f. (1845)
Goodyera sumbawana  Ormerod (2005)
Goodyera taitensis  Blume (1858)
Goodyera tesselata  Lodd. (1824)
Goodyera thailandica  Seidenf. (1969)
Goodyera turialbae  Schltr. (1923)
Goodyera umbrosa D.L.Jones & M.A.Clem. (2014)
Goodyera venusta  Schltr. (1911)
Goodyera viridiflora (Blume) Blume (1858)
Goodyera vitiensis (L.O.Williams) Kores (1989)
Goodyera vittata  Benth. ex Hook.f. (1890)
Goodyera werneri  Schltr. (1921)
Goodyera wolongensis  K.Y.Lang (1984) 
Goodyera wuana  Tang & F.T.Wang (1951)
Goodyera yamiana  Fukuy. (1936)
Goodyera yunnanensis  Schltr. (1919)
Goodyera zacuapanensis  Ormerod (2006)

References

External links 
 

 
Cranichideae genera